The World Sailing's Sailing World Cup is a series of sailing regattas. The World Cup came into existence during the 2008–09 Season. The series includes boats that have competed in the Olympics and Paralympics.

The world cup was from the beginning composed of the major regattas Sail Melbourne in Melbourne, US Sailings's Rolex Miami OCR in Miami, Trofeo SAR Princess Sofia in Palma de Majorca, Semaine Olympique Francaise in Hyeres and Delta Lloyd Regatta in Medemblik.

Seasons

References

External links
 Official website
 AllSportDB.com Competition page

 
World Sailing
Sailing competitions
Sailing
Recurring sporting events established in 2008